This is a list of museums in Uzbekistan.

Museums in Uzbekistan 

Amir Timur Museum
Afrasiab Museum of Samarkand
Bukhara State Architectural Art Museum-Preserve
Nukus Museum of Art
Ulugh Beg Observatory
State Museum of History of Uzbekistan
Museum of Arts of Uzbekistan
The Museum of Communication History in Uzbekistan
Shahrisabz Museum of History and Material Culture

See also 

 List of museums
 List of archives in Uzbekistan
 List of libraries in Uzbekistan

External links 	

Museums
 
Museums
Uzbekistan
Museums
Uzbekistan